Víctor Andrés Cedron Zurita (born 6 October 1993) is a Peruvian footballer who plays as a winger for Asociación Deportiva Tarma in the Peruvian Primera División.

Club career
Victor Cedron joined the Universidad César Vallejo first team in January 2011. His league debut in Torneo Descentralizado came quickly on 13 February 2011 in matchday 1 at home to Colegio Nacional Iquitos. Manager Víctor Rivera put him in the match for Juan Pablo Vergara late in the game to finish off the 3–0 win for his side. He played his first game as a starter in his third league appearance, but he couldn't help side avoid a 3–1 defeat away to León de Huánuco.

References

External links

1993 births
Living people
People from Trujillo, Peru
Peruvian footballers
Club Deportivo Universidad César Vallejo footballers
Club Alianza Lima footballers
Juan Aurich footballers
FBC Melgar footballers
Figueirense FC players
Unión Comercio footballers
Peruvian Primera División players
Campeonato Brasileiro Série B players
Association football wingers
Footballers at the 2015 Pan American Games
Expatriate footballers in Brazil
Peruvian expatriate sportspeople in Brazil
Pan American Games competitors for Peru